No Man's Land was a German record label based in Würzburg, Germany. Formed in 1984, it ceased trading in 1997. The label was run by its proprietors in combination with the music publishing and record label Review Records and the distribution company Recommended No Man's Land. The latter was part of the network of distributors associated with the British record label and distributor, Recommended Records. No Man's Land specialised in releases by experimental jazz and avant-garde artists.

Discography
 nml 8401 The Romans - You Only Live Once
 nml 8502 Doctor Nerve - Out to Bomb Fresh Kings
 nml 8503 Lindsay Cooper - Music for Other Occasions
 nml 8505 :zoviet-france: - [GRIS]
 nml 8506 Jad Fair - Best Wishes
 nml 8506b Jad Fair - Best Wishes Booklet
 nml 8604 Meltable Snaps It - Points Blank
 nml 8608 Orthotonics - Luminous Bipeds
 nml 8609 Skeleton Crew - The Country of Blinds
 nml 8707D various artists Island of Sanity: New Music from New York City
 nml 8710 Tom Cora - Live at the Western Front
 nml 8712 Zeena Parkins - Something Out There
 nml 8811 Geoff Leigh / Frank Wuyts - From Here to Drums
 nml 8813 various artists - A Classic Guide to No Man's Land
 nml 8814 Non Credo - Reluctant Hosts
 nml 8815 Half Japanese - Charmed Life
 nml 8816 Christian Marclay - More Encores
 nml 8917 Half Japanese - The Band That Would Be King
 nml 9319 François Ribac / Eva Schwabe - Opéra
 nml 9420 Sugarconnection - Plays Alien Cakes
 nml 9825 Dawn - Dusk
 nml/D 873 Kinothek Percussion Ensemble - Industry!
 nml/GRRR 2012 Un Drame Musical Instantané - Urgent Meeting

External links
 No Man's Land No Man's Land on discogs.com, a community-built database of music information

Record labels established in 1984
Defunct record labels of Germany